George C. Hull (January 28, 1878 – February 2, 1953) was an American screenwriter. He wrote for 50 films between 1918 and 1932. He died in Los Angeles, California.

Partial filmography

 The Sea Flower (1918)
 The Fighting Brothers (1919)
 His Buddy (1919)
 'If Only' Jim (1920)
 Hitchin' Posts (1920)
 West is West (1920)
 White Youth (1920)
 The Freeze-Out (1921)
 The Wallop (1921)
 Tiger True (1921)
Desperate Youth (1921)
 Sure Fire (1921)
 Conflict (1921)
 Man to Man (1922)
 Human Hearts (1922)
 The Girl Who Ran Wild (1922)
 One Wonderful Night (1922)
 The Gentleman from America (1923)
 Single Handed (1923)
 Double Dealing (1923)
 Out of Luck (1923)
 Where is This West? (1923)
 Wanderer of the Wasteland (1924)
 The Border Legion (1924)
 Lord Jim (1925)
 The Sorrows of Satan (1926)
 Beware of Blondes (1928)
 The Phantom of the North (1929)

External links

1878 births
1953 deaths
American male screenwriters
20th-century American male writers
20th-century American screenwriters